Nonceba Kontsiwe is a South African politician and a veteran African National Congress (ANC) member of the Eastern Cape Provincial Legislature. On 9 March 2021, Kontsiwe was appointed as the Member of the Executive Council (MEC) responsible for Human Settlements by premier Oscar Mabuyane. During a cabinet reshuffle on 16 August 2022, Kontsiwe was appointed as the MEC for Sports, Recreation, Arts and Culture.

Kontsiwe was born in Ntabethemba. She was elected to the provincial legislature in 2014.

References

External links

Living people
Year of birth missing (living people)
Xhosa people
People from the Eastern Cape
African National Congress politicians
Members of the Eastern Cape Provincial Legislature
Women members of provincial legislatures of South Africa